Polyura dolon, the stately nawab or stately rajah (because it was formerly placed in Charaxes), is a butterfly found in India belonging to the rajahs and nawabs group, that is, the Charaxinae group of the brush-footed butterflies family.

See also
Charaxinae
Nymphalidae
List of butterflies of India
List of butterflies of India (Nymphalidae)

References
 

Polyura
Butterflies of Asia
Butterflies of Indochina
Butterflies described in 1848